McIlquham is a surname. Notable people with the surname include:

Gord McIlquham (born 1961), Canadian sailor
Harriet McIlquham (1837–1910), English suffragist
Mary McIlquham (1901–?), English tennis player